Around the World in 80 Minutes with Douglas Fairbanks is a 1931 American Pre-Code documentary film directed by Douglas Fairbanks and Victor Fleming and written by Robert E. Sherwood. The film was released on December 12, 1931, by United Artists.

Synopsis

Douglas Fairbanks, Sr. and a crew of three — photographers Harry Sharp and Chuck Lewis and co-director Victor Fleming — journey around the World and report on various cultural curiosities and the humor they find in everyday life overseas. Beginning with Japan, Fairbanks focuses on the people and observes a Japanese woman demonstrating how her maids assemble her headdress. Fairbanks and his crew then travel to China, where they are greeted by one of China's greatest actors, female impersonator Mei Lanfang. Further travels take them to the walls of the Forbidden City in Peking, the tomb of Dr Sun Yat-sen and the city of Hong Kong. En route, Fairbanks exercises aboard the ocean liner , displaying his athlete's physique while doing deck drills. He is also shown playing golf. In Indochina the Maharanee of Cooch-Behar provides Fairbanks with fifty elephants and attendants for an expedition into the jungle to hunt leopards. In the Philippines, Fairbanks films former President of the Philippines Emilio Aguinaldo as he poses and speaks for the camera. After passing through Cambodia and Bangkok, Fairbanks stops in Siam, where he visits a party attended by many foreign dignitaries at the estate of the King of Siam.

At this point, the live action is interrupted by a short animated sequence of Mickey Mouse dancing to Siamese music. In India, the film focuses on the Taj Mahal, life on the Ganges river, a Hindu cremation ceremony, a performance of trained birds stringing beads, the Palace of Kushabaha and an elephant trip to hunt for a leopard. The film concludes with a "magic carpet" ride back to Hollywood, which incorporates aerial footage of Chicago and the Los Angeles basin.

Home media
The film was released on a manufactured-on-demand DVD-R on May 29, 2012 and on DVD on October 15, 2019.

References

External links
 

1931 films
American films with live action and animation
American black-and-white films
1931 documentary films
Black-and-white documentary films
United Artists films
Films directed by Victor Fleming
American documentary films
1930s English-language films
1930s American films